Urban Ghost Story is a 1998 British horror film directed by Geneviève Jolliffe, written by Geneviève Jolliffe and Chris Jones, and starring Jason Connery, Nicola Stapleton, Billy Boyd, Stephanie Buttle, and Heather Ann Foster. It is set in a high-rise housing estate in Glasgow.

Plot 
The plot follows 12-year-old Lizzie (Heather Ann Foster) who, after being involved in a road traffic accident and suffering a near-death experience, feels that she is haunted by a malicious spirit that she brought back with her from the afterlife. Although surrounded by people who disbelieve her claims, Lizzie and her mother eventually encounter a journalist who, although initially skeptical, comes to eventually believe the claims and with the assistance of a university parapsychologist the family start to confront with the events.

Cast 

 Jason Connery ...  John Fox
 Stephanie Buttle ...  Kate Fisher
 Heather Ann Foster ...  Lizzie Fisher
 Nicola Stapleton ...  Kerrie
 James Cosmo ...  Minister
 Elizabeth Berrington ...  Mrs. Ash
 Siri Neal ...  Social Worker (as Siri O'Neal)
 Andreas Wisniewski ...  Quinn
 Billy Boyd ...  Loan Shark
 Kenneth Bryans ...  Mr. Ash
 Carolyn Bonnyman ...  Mrs. Miller
 Alan Owen ...  Alex Fisher
 Stephen MacDonald ...  Coroner
 Julie Austin ... Teacher
 Nicola Greene ...  WPC Tomkins

Production 

Following production of their previous film, White Angel, Geneviève Jolliffe and Chris Jones researched Poltergeist activity including the Enfield Poltergeist occurrences. Filming took place at Ealing Studios with location shots done in Glasgow.

Reception 
The film was nominated for two British Independent Film Awards. It won two Fantafestival awards, for Best Actress and Best Film. Total Film described the film as "Poltergeist, Ken Loach-style". Michael Thomson stated that "the director relies on too much editing within scenes, so the film often moves too quickly from one face to another instead of moving fluently with unbroken shots. In this way, we are unhooked from a film which should really have grabbed and gripped."

References

External links 

 
 
 
 Urban Ghost Story at BBC

Films set in Scotland
Films set in Glasgow
British horror films
Scottish films
British ghost films
British supernatural horror films
1998 horror films
1998 films
Films scored by Rupert Gregson-Williams
1990s English-language films
1990s British films